Richard Cox (born 1 May 1951) is a New Zealand cricketer. He played in one first-class and one List A match for Central Districts in 1971/72 and 1975/76.

See also
 List of Central Districts representative cricketers

References

External links
 

1951 births
Living people
New Zealand cricketers
Central Districts cricketers
People from Waipawa
Sportspeople from the Hawke's Bay Region